Karimpuzha Wildlife Sanctuary is a Wildlife sanctuary near Nilambur,  Malappuram district in the Indian state of Kerala. It is declared as a wildlife sanctuary on 3 July 2020. It covers an area of 227.97 sq km and comprises the New Amarambalam Reserved Forest and Vadakkekotta vested forest, except the Manjeri colony of the Cholanaikar tribe. It forms a portion of the Nilgiri Biosphere Reserve.

Ecological significance
The Karimpuzha WLS links the  Silent Valley National Park in Kerala and Mukurthi National Park in Tamil Nadu  and thereby create a contiguous protective area stretch. It also borders the Mukkuruthi National Park in the south and the Silent Valley National Park buffer zone in the northeast. Also, the New Amarambalam reserve which is part of the Karimpuzha wildlife sanctuary has one of the most pristine forests untouched by humans.

The landscape of the wildlife sanctuary ranges from 40m to 2,654m above sea level and hence have a huge altitudinal gradient. The Karimpuzha sanctuary is also the only forest stretch in Kerala where seven forest types are all present- Semi-evergreen forest, Evergreen rainforest, moist deciduous forest, sub-tropical savannah, sub-tropical hill forest, montane wet temperate forest and montane wet grasslands.

Fauna
The Karimpuzha wildlife sanctuary has almost all the mammals endemic to Western Ghats including the Nilgiri Tahr and Lion-tailed macaque. The wildlife sanctuary is home to 226 bird, 213 butterfly species, 23 species amphibian species,  33 reptile species and  several endangered fish species.

See also
Silent Valley National Park
Mukurthi National Park

References

Wildlife sanctuaries in Kerala
South Western Ghats moist deciduous forests
Wildlife sanctuaries of the Western Ghats
South Western Ghats montane rain forests
Protected areas of Kerala
Wildlife sanctuaries of India
2020 establishments in Kerala
Protected areas established in 2020